Christoph Bechmann (born 23 November 1971 in Speyer am Rhein, Rheinland-Pfalz) is a field hockey player from Germany, who was a member of the Men's National Team that won the bronze medal at the 2004 Summer Olympics in Athens, Greece.

The striker from Club an der Alster (Hamburg), whose nicknamed Duffi or Bechi,  played in three Summer Olympics, starting in 1996. He has captained the German National Team and was a member of the Team of the Year in Mönchengladbach, Germany.

International Senior Tournaments
He played from 1994 until 2004, 124 matches for the Germany national team in outdoor competitions.

 1994 – 8th World Cup, Sydney (4th place)
 1995 – European Nations Cup, Dublin (1st place)
 1995 – Champions Trophy, Berlin (1st place)
 1996 – Summer Olympics, Atlanta (4th place)
 1996 – Champions Trophy, Madras (3rd place)
 1997 – European Indoor Nations Cup, Lievin (1st place)
 1997 – Champions Trophy, Adelaide (1st place)
 1998 – 9th World Cup, Utrecht (3rd place)
 1999 – European Indoor Nations Cup, Slagelse (1st place)
 1999 – European Nations Cup, Padua (1st place)
 2000 – Champions Trophy, Amstelveen (2nd place)
 2000 – Summer Olympics, Sydney (5th place)
 2002 – 10th World Cup, Kuala Lumpur (1st place)
 2002 – Champions Trophy, Cologne (2nd place)
 2003 – European Nations Cup, Barcelona (1st place)
 2004 – Summer Olympics, Athens (3rd place)
 2005 – World Games, Duisburg (1st place)
 2006 – European Indoor Nations Cup, Eindhoven (1st place)

References

External links
 

1971 births
Living people
People from Speyer
German male field hockey players
Olympic field hockey players of Germany
Olympic bronze medalists for Germany
Field hockey players at the 1996 Summer Olympics
Field hockey players at the 2000 Summer Olympics
Field hockey players at the 2004 Summer Olympics
Olympic medalists in field hockey
Medalists at the 2004 Summer Olympics
1998 Men's Hockey World Cup players
2002 Men's Hockey World Cup players
Harvestehuder THC players
Der Club an der Alster players
Male field hockey forwards
Sportspeople from Rhineland-Palatinate
20th-century German people
21st-century German people